Kirstie Fryirs is an Australian geomorphologist researching fluvial geomorphology and river management.

Early life and education 
Fryirs is originally from Sydney, Australia. She has a Bachelor of Science (Honours) and PhD from Macquarie University for her 2001 thesis titled "A geomorphic approach for assessing the condition and recovery potential of rivers application in Bega Catchment, South Coast, New South Wales, Australia".

Career and impact 
As of 2021 Fryirs is Deputy Associate Dean Research in the Faculty of Science and Engineering at Macquarie University. She is dedicated to university teaching and research, as well as outreach activities focused on scientific communication.

She is best known for the creation of the tool for evaluating river condition called River Styles Framework with the Australian specialist Gary Brierley.

Fryirs is currently working with other researchers from Macquarie University, in promoting "river champions in order to realize sustainable, participatory river and water management in Australia".

Awards 
Fryirs holds several awards on research, teaching and postgraduate supervision. She was awarded the international Gordon Warwick Medal at the British Society for Geomorphology in 2015. She also researched heavy metal contamination at Casey and Wilkes stations in Antarctica for two summer seasons.

Selected works 
 Geomorphology and River Management, Blackwell, 2005
 River Futures, Island Press, 2008 
 Geomorphic Analysis of River Systems: An Approach to Reading the Landscape, Wiley, 2013

References

External links 

 Kirstie Fryirs at Macquarie University
 

Macquarie University alumni
Living people
Year of birth missing (living people)
Australian geomorphologists
Australian women geologists